The Larceny Act 1901 (1 Edw 7 c 10) was an Act of the Parliament of the United Kingdom. It created offences of fraudulent conversion.

This Act amended sections 75 and 76 of the Larceny Act 1861. It made the offence of fraudulently misappropriating property entrusted to a person by another, or received by him on behalf of another a misdemeanour punishable by penal servitude for a term not exceeding seven years, or by imprisonment, with or without hard labour, for a term not exceeding two years.

This Act was repealed as to England and Ireland by section 48(1) of, and the Schedule to, the Larceny Act 1916.

Section 1

Form of indictment

The following specimen counts were formerly contained in paragraph 26 of the Second Schedule to the Indictments Act 1915 before it was repealed.

See also
Larceny Act

References
Hansard,

External links

United Kingdom Acts of Parliament 1901